The Action Party, in 2004-2008 and 2016-2018 Eurosceptic Action Party is a political organization in Latvia. It was founded under the name "Eurosceptics" before the 2003 referendum on Latvia's accession to the European Union, merging the party "Be a Human" (founded in 1998) and the public organization "Movement for Independence". The most prominent representatives of the organization were Normunds Grostiņš (former chairman of the board), artist Juris Dimiters, publicist Jānis Kučinskis and Viktors Dinēvičs.

Initially, the party has cooperated with the populist political association "Dzimtene" and the far-left  Socialist Party of Latvia, since 2011 it has been operating in the right-wing euro-critical party "European Alliance for Freedom" together with the Austrian Freedom Party and the French National Front.

History 
In the 2004 European elections, the party won 0.95% of the vote. In the 2005 Riga City Council elections, "Eurosceptics", remaining organisationally independent, participated in the joint list of "Dzimtene" and LSP, without obtaining any mandate. The consolidated list won 11.5% of the vote. In the Saeima elections of 2006, the party received 0.37% of the vote.

In 2008, the party was renamed the Action Party. In the 2009 European Parliament election in Latvia, the party won 0.43% of the vote (3,415 valid ballot papers), but in the 2013 Riga City Council elections - 0.24% of the vote.

The party last participated in the 2017 municipal elections under the name "Eurosceptic Action Party" with little success and in the 2020 Riga City Council snap election again as the Action Party, receiving 0.18% of the vote. 

The leader of the party, Ruslans Pankratovs, was detained by the State Security Service of Latvia in August 2022 on suspicion of public support for the Russian invasion of Ukraine and evasion of sanctions placed on Russia. He was also spotted while attending a conference that took place in the Russian-occupied areas of Zaporizhzhia Oblast in July 2022.

References 

Eurosceptic parties in Latvia